This article is about the phonology of Bernese German. It deals with current phonology and phonetics, including geographical variants. Like other High Alemannic varieties, it has a two-way contrast in plosives and fricatives that is not based on voicing, but on length. The absence of voice in plosives and fricatives is typical for all High German varieties, but many of them have no two-way contrast due to general lenition.

Vowels

Monophthongs

  are true-mid [, ].
  occurs only in weak unstressed syllables.

Vowel length
There is a distinctive length opposition in all vowels except . Unlike in standard German, there is no interdependence of vowel length and vowel quality.

Diphthongs
Bernese German has seven diphthong phonemes:
Three closing diphthongs: 
Three opening diphthongs: 
One long diphthong: 

This phenomenon is also found in the neighbouring Bernese Highlands and Sense District dialects.

This phenomenon is also found in the neighbouring Solothurn and Lucerne dialects.

Consonants

  are bilabial,  is bilabial-labiodental, whereas  are labiodental.
  has a labialized velar allophone , see below.
  is usually alveolar , but in the old upper-class dialect of the patricians it is uvular .
  are velar, whereas  is palatal.
  vary between velar  and uvular .
 In addition to occurring on its own,  may occur as a realization of the sequence .

Fortis and lenis consonants
Bernese German obstruents occur in pairs, as in other Alemannic varieties. These pairs are usually called fortis and lenis. They are not distinguished by voicedness, but they differ in length. A difference in tenseness is also discussed. It has not been established whether length or tenseness is the primary feature that distinguishes these pairs. Likewise, there are different possibilities of transcription. They are often transcribed with the IPA-signs for pairs of voiceless and voiced obstruents (for instance). In order to explicate that no voicedness is involved in the contrast, the diacritic for voicelessness may be used (for instance). Another possibility of transcription is the notation of the length, either with the IPA length sign (for instance) or with doubling (for instance). The opposition is only possible if the obstruents are surrounded by voiced sounds. If there is another adjacent voiceless sound (except ), then there is no opposition.

With the fricatives, the opposition does not occur at the beginning of a syllable. This is similar to the length opposition that occurs in the continuants . With the stops, however, the opposition is not restricted with respect to syllable structure and also occurs in the syllable onset, for instance  ('to bake') vs.  ('baked, past participle'); in order for this opposition not to be neutralized, there must be a preceding voiced sound, for instance  ('I want to bake a cake') vs.  ('I have baked a cake').

As in other Alemannic dialects, but unlike other Germanic languages, there is no interdependence of the length of a consonant with the length of the preceding vowel. Fortis consonants may occur after either long or short vowels, and lenis consonants as well:

Vocalization of /l/
Long  is pronounced , for instance  →  ('ball');  at the end of a syllable , for instance  →  ('cold').

This feature is absent in the old upper-class dialect of the patricians.

Velarization of 
 is pronounced  in most cases, for instance  →  ('dog') or  →  ('child').

This feature is absent in the old upper-class dialect of the patricians.

In the southwestern dialects of the Schwarzenburg area, it is pronounced .

Reduction of 
In the western and southern dialects (not in the city of Bern),  is pronounced , for instance  →  ('to think').

Stress
In native words, the word stem is stressed, except verbs with a separable prefix where that prefix is stressed.

In loan words, there is – in comparison to standard German – a preference for initial stress, for instance Bernese German  ('casino'),  ('chalet') vs. standard German , .

Diachronics

Vowel lengthening and shortening

A distinctive trait of Bernese German that sets it apart from other High Alemannic varieties is the occurrence of vowel shortening in comparison to Middle High German. Before other consonants, it may be restricted to disyllabic words, for instance  ('finer'),  ('to foul') as opposed to monosyllabic  ('fine'),  ('foul') with an unshortened vowel.

In the close vowels, the shortened and lengthened vowels remain distinct from originally short and long vowels.

References

Literature 

 

Swiss German language
German dialects
Canton of Bern
German phonology